Sir Richard Godin Simeon, 2nd Baronet (21 May 1784 – 4 January 1854) was an English Liberal Party politician.

Simeon was born in 1784, the son of Sir John Simeon, 1st Baronet and Rebecca Cornwall.

Simeon was elected at the 1832 general election as the Member of Parliament (MP) for the Isle of Wight, a new constituency which had been created by the Reform Act 1832. He was re-elected in 1835, and stood down from the House of Commons at the 1837 general election.

He was appointed as a Deputy Lieutenant of the Isle of Wight 1831, and in 1846. He also served as High Sheriff of Hampshire for 1845. Charles and John Simeon were his sons.

References

External links 
 

1784 births
1854 deaths
Liberal Party (UK) MPs for English constituencies
UK MPs 1832–1835
UK MPs 1835–1837
Baronets in the Baronetage of the United Kingdom
Deputy Lieutenants of the Isle of Wight
High Sheriffs of Hampshire
Members of Parliament for the Isle of Wight
Richard